C92 may refer to :
 Ruy Lopez chess openings ECO code
 Myeloid leukemia ICD-10 code
 Accommodation of Crews Convention (Revised), 1949 code
 Honda C92, a motorcycle
 Mentone Airport in Mentone, Indiana FAA LID
 Caldwell 92 (the Carina Nebula, NGC 3372), a bright nebula and star-forming region in the constellation of Carina